David Wiggett (25 May 1957 – 23 March 1978) was an English footballer who played for Lincoln City and Hartlepool United before losing his life in a car crash.

Wiggett, a left-back, began his career at Graham Taylor's Lincoln City, making his first-team debut in 1974. He made only a handful of appearances for the Imps, and joined Hartlepool in October 1976, where he made his debut in a Division Four match against Colchester United. During his 18-month spell at Hartlepool, Wiggett played 60 matches for the club, and scored one goal. On 23 March 1978 Wiggett was killed in a car crash. He was a passenger in a car driven by his Hartlepool teammate Bob Newton.

Two days after the crash, a minute of silence was observed before Hartlepool's away match against arch-rivals Darlington. Allegedly, sections of the Darlington crowd chanted throughout the minute of silence, and what followed was a very bad-tempered match Hartlepool eventually won 2–1. Following the match, Hartlepool manager Billy Horner, himself a former Darlington player, called the offending Darlo fans "a disgrace to their club, their town, and the human race".

References

1957 births
1978 deaths
English footballers
Lincoln City F.C. players
Hartlepool United F.C. players
Road incident deaths in England
Association football defenders